Smokey and the Bandit is a 1977 American road action comedy film starring Burt Reynolds, Sally Field, Jackie Gleason, Jerry Reed, Pat McCormick, Paul Williams and Mike Henry. The directorial debut of stuntman Hal Needham, the film follows Bo "Bandit" Darville (Reynolds) and Cledus "Snowman" Snow (Reed), two bootleggers attempting to illegally transport 400 cases of Coors beer from Texarkana to Atlanta. While the Snowman drives the truck carrying the beer, the Bandit drives a 1976 Pontiac Trans Am (dressed as a 1977. More on this below under, "Vehicles") to distract law enforcement (called blocking) and keep the attention off the Snowman. During their run, they are pursued by Texas county sheriff Buford T. Justice (Gleason). Smokey and the Bandit was the second highest-grossing domestic film of 1977 in the United States. Sally Field and Burt Reynolds began a relationship after meeting on set.

Plot
Wealthy Texan Big Enos Burdette and his son Little Enos have sponsored a racer in Atlanta's Southern Classic and want to celebrate in style when he wins, so they are seeking a trucker willing to bootleg Coors Beer to Atlanta for their refreshment. They find local legend Bo "Bandit" Darville at a roadeo at Lakewood Fairgrounds and offer him  to haul 400 cases of Coors from Texarkana (the closest place it could be legally sold at that time) to Atlanta in 28 hours. The Bandit takes the bet on the risky and unprecedented task, and recruits his partner Cledus "Snowman" Snow to drive the truck, while Bandit drives a black Pontiac Trans Am bought in advance from the Burdettes as a "blocker" to divert attention away from the truck and its illegal cargo.

The pair arrive in Texarkana one hour early and load up the truck, but just as they head back, Carrie, a runaway bride, intercepts Bandit and jumps in his car, unwittingly making him an indirect target of Sheriff Buford T. Justice, a career Texas lawman whose witless son Junior was to have married Carrie. Buford, with Junior along, ignores his jurisdiction and doggedly chases Bandit all the way to Georgia to retrieve Carrie while various mishaps cause his cruiser to disintegrate on the way.

Bandit attracts more police attention across Dixie as Snowman barrels on toward Atlanta with the contraband beer, but they are helped en route by many colorful characters via CB radio. Neither Buford nor any other lawmen know of Snowman's illegal manifest, while Bandit is likewise unaware that Buford is chasing him because of Carrie, whose jumpiness inspires Bandit to give her the CB handle "Frog".

Just after re-entering Georgia, Snowman is rescued by Bandit after being stopped by a Georgia State Patrol motorcycle trooper, and state and local police intensely pursue Bandit with roadblocks and a helicopter to track his movement. With four miles left, Bandit, discouraged by the unexpected mounting attention, is ready to give up, but Snowman, who initially thought they would fail, takes the lead and smashes through the roadblock at the fairgrounds' main entrance. They return with one minute remaining their time limit, but instead of taking the payoff, Carrie and Bandit accept a double-or-nothing offer from Little Enos: a challenge to run up to Boston and bring back clam chowder in 18 hours. They quickly escape in one of Big Enos's 13 Cadillacs as police flood the racetrack.

After passing Buford's badly damaged cruiser on the roadside, Bandit gets on the CB and initially directs him to the Burdettes, but then respectfully gives his real location—right behind Buford, who continues his chase leaving Junior behind, and with more parts falling off his cruiser as he limps off after Bandit.

Cast
Burt Reynolds as Bo "The Bandit" Darville
Sally Field as Carrie "Frog"
Jerry Reed as Cledus "The Snowman" Snow
Jackie Gleason as Sheriff Buford T. Justice / "Smokey Bear"
Mike Henry as Junior Justice
Pat McCormick as Enos "Big Enos" Burdette
Paul Williams as Enos "Little Enos" Burdette
Macon McCalman as Mr. B
Susan McIver as "Hot Pants" Hillyard
George Reynolds as Sheriff George Branford
Laura Lizer Sommers as "Little Beaver"
Michael Mann as Branford's Deputy
Lamar Jackson as "Sugar Bear"
Ronnie Gay as Georgia Trooper
Quinnon Sheffield as Alabama Trooper
Alfie Wise as Alabama Patrolman
Pat Hustis as Tow Truck Driver
Ingeborg Kjeldsen as Foxy Lady
Michael McManus as Trucker "Silver Tongued Devil"
Gene Witham as Leader of The Gang
Susan Sindelar as Motorcycle Gang Member
Ben Jones as Trucker #1
Joe Klecko as Trucker #2
Hank Worden as Trucker #3
Sonny Shroyer as Motorcycle Cop (uncredited)

Production

Development
Needham originally planned the film as a low-budget B movie with a production cost of $1 million, with Reed as the Bandit. Needham had great difficulty getting any studios or producers to take his project seriously, being better known in the film industry as a stuntman. He obtained the attention of studios and aimed the film at a more mainstream release after his friend Reynolds read the script and agreed to portray the Bandit, with Reed now portraying the Bandit's friend the Snowman. Reed would eventually play the Bandit in Smokey and the Bandit Part 3, in which Reynolds only appeared in a cameo near the end. At the time, Reynolds was the top box office star in the world.

In the original script, Carrie was called Kate while Big Enos and Little Enos were called Kyle and Dickey. The Bandit's car was a second-generation Trans Am and the prize for completing the run was a new truck rather than $80,000. Reynolds revealed in his autobiography that Needham had written the first draft script on legal pads. Upon showing it to his friend, Reynolds told Needham that it was the worst script he had ever read, but that he would still make the movie. Most of the dialogue was improvised on set.

Universal Studios bankrolled Smokey and the Bandit for $5.3 million, figuring it was a good risk. Just two days before production was to begin, Universal sent a "hatchet man" to Atlanta to inform Needham that the budget was being trimmed by $1 million. With Reynolds' salary at $1 million, Needham was left with only $3.3 million to make the film. Needham and assistant director David Hamburger spent 30 hours revising the shooting schedule.

"Buford T. Justice" was the name of a real Florida Highway Patrolman known to Reynolds' father, who was once Police Chief of Riviera Beach, Florida. His father was also the inspiration for the word "sumbitch" used in the film, a variation of the phrase "son-of-a-bitch" that, according to Reynolds, he uttered quite often. Gleason was given free rein to ad-lib dialogue and make suggestions. It was his idea to have Junior alongside him throughout the film. In particular, the scene where Sheriff Justice unknowingly encounters the Bandit in a roadside diner (a "choke and puke" in CB lingo) was not in the original story but was rather Gleason's idea.

The film's theme song, "East Bound and Down", was written virtually overnight by Reed. He gave Needham a preview of the song and, getting no reaction, offered to rewrite it. In response, Needham told Reed that he liked the song so much that if Reed changed even a word or a note, Needham would "choke him". It would become one of Reed's biggest hits and his signature song.

The film features the custom clothing and costuming of Niver Western Wear of Fort Worth, Texas. Niver provided much of the western attire worn in the film, as well as the custom-made sheriff's uniforms (waist size 64") that Gleason wore throughout the film.

While made to take advantage of the ongoing 1970s CB radio fad, the film added to the craze. Though the film Moonrunners (1975) is the precursor to the television series The Dukes of Hazzard (1979–1985), from the same creator and with many identical settings and concepts, the popularity of Smokey and the Bandit and similar films helped get the Dukes series on the air. Three actors from the main cast of The Dukes of Hazzard appear in small uncredited roles in Smokey and the Bandit: Ben Jones, John Schneider, and Sonny Shroyer (who played a police officer in both). In return, Reynolds portrayed Boss Hogg (originally portrayed by Sorrell Booke) in the film adaptation The Dukes of Hazzard (2005). Reynolds is referenced by name in several early episodes of the series.

Casting
Before Gleason was cast in the film, Richard Boone was originally considered for the role of Buford T. Justice. Sally Field only accepted the part after her agent advised her that she needed a big movie role on her résumé. Reynolds actively pushed for her casting after Universal initially resisted, claiming Field was not attractive enough. Field enjoyed making the film, but remembers that virtually the entire project was improvised.

Filming
Principal photography of the film began on August 30, 1976. The movie was primarily filmed in Georgia, in the cities of McDonough, Jonesboro, and Lithonia. The scenes set in Texarkana were filmed in Jonesboro and the surrounding area and many of the chase scenes were filmed in the surrounding areas on Highway 54 between Fayetteville and Jonesboro for a majority of the driving scenes, Mundy's Mill Road, Main Street in Jonesboro, Georgia State Route 400, I-85 (Pleasant Hill exit) and in McDonough. However, the scene where they drive through the Shell gas station was filmed in Ojai, California, on the corner of Ojai Avenue and El Paseo Road. Much of the surrounding scene comes from that immediate vicinity. The scene featuring the racetrack was filmed at Lakewood Speedway at the old Lakewood Fairgrounds on Atlanta's south side. The roller coaster in the movie was the Greyhound. It had not been used for some time and was repainted for the film. It was destroyed in Smokey and the Bandit II and in a flashback scene in Part 3. The area around Helen, Georgia, was used for some locations. The tow truck driver was a local garage owner, Berlin Wike. Reynolds and Field began dating during the filming.

According to an interview with Susie McIver Ewing on The RetroZest Podcast, she was picked to play the role of Hot Pants Hilliard after the dailies footage (shot in the Atlanta area) of the original actress playing the role was inadvertently destroyed on its way from Atlanta to Los Angeles. The new Hot Pants scene had to quickly be refilmed as a part of a second unit in the San Fernando Valley and was shot at a drive-in restaurant near Hansen Dam named Baby Beef Burgers, which has since been demolished. This same restaurant was used for a scene in the 1983 Stephen King Movie Christine, which was ultimately cut in the final film (it can be viewed as a deleted scene on the DVD release of the film).

Vehicles

Hal Needham saw an advertisement for the soon-to-be-released 1977 Pontiac Trans Am and knew right away that it would be the Bandit's car, or, as Needham referred to it, a character in the movie. He contacted Pontiac and an agreement was made that four 1977 Trans Ams and two Pontiac LeMans four-door sedans would be provided for the movie. The Trans Ams were actually 1976-model cars with 1977 front ends (from 1970 to 1976, both the Firebird/Trans Am and Chevrolet Camaro have two round headlights and in 1977, the Firebird/Trans Am was changed to four rectangular headlights, and the Camaro remained unchanged). The decals were changed to 1977-style units, as evidenced by the engine size callouts on the hood scoop being in liters rather than cubic inches, as had been the case in 1976. The hood scoop on these cars says "6.6 LITRE", which, in 1977, would have denoted an Oldsmobile 403-equipped car or a non-W-72, 180 hp version of the 400 Pontiac engine.

The cars were 1976 models, the engines fitted to them were 455ci power plants, the last year these engines were offered for sale before withdrawal. All four of the cars were badly damaged during production, one of which was all but destroyed during the jump over the dismantled Mulberry bridge. The Trans Am used for said jump was equipped with a booster rocket, the same type that was used by Evel Knievel during his failed Snake River Canyon jump. Needham served as the driver for the stunt (in place of Reynolds), while Lada St. Edmund was in the same car (in place of Field). By the film's ending, the final surviving Trans Am and LeMans were both barely running and the other cars had become parts donors to keep them running. This gives rise to various continuity errors with Justice's patrol car, which during some chase sequences is shown with a black rear fender, which then reverts to the car's bronze color again in later scenes. When it is finally torn off along with the car's roof in the impact with the girder, the missing fender still reappears later on in the film. The Burdettes' car is a 1974 Cadillac Eldorado convertible painted in a "Candy Red" color scheme and is seen briefly at the beginning of the movie and in the final scene as the Bandit, the Snowman, Fred the dog, and Frog use it to make their escape. Three Kenworth W900A short-frame semi trucks, driven by Reed, were each equipped with 38-inch sleepers. Two units were 1974 models, as evidenced by standard silver Kenworth emblems on the truck grille, and one unit was a 1973 model, as evidenced by the gold-painted Kenworth emblem on the truck's grille, signifying Kenworth's 50 years in business. The paint code for each truck was coffee brown with gold trims and the  mural trailer used was manufactured by Hobbs Trailers in Texas with a non-operational Thermo King Refrigeration unit. This is obvious, because there is no fuel tank on the underside of the trailer to power the refrigeration unit, and the unit is never heard running.

Legal status of Coors beer
In 1977, Coors was unavailable for sale east of Oklahoma. Its lack of additives and preservatives meant that Coors could spoil in one week without refrigeration, explaining the film's 28-hour deadline. A 1974 Time magazine article explains that Coors was so coveted for its lack of stabilizers and preservatives, and Coors Banquet Beer had a brief renaissance. Future President Gerald Ford, after a trip to Colorado, hid it in his luggage to take it back to Washington, D.C. President Dwight D. Eisenhower had a steady supply airlifted by the Air Force to Washington. Carl Yastrzemski of the Boston Red Sox would bring several cases after playing on the West Coast, by stashing them in the equipment trunks on the team's plane. Frederick Amon smuggled it from Colorado to North Carolina and sold it for four times the retail price.

Coors is still brewed just outside Denver, Colorado. It is now sold in all states as Coors ships it in refrigerated train cars and bottled locally and sold in different parts of the country including the eastern US states.

Soundtrack

The theme music "East Bound and Down" was sung and co-written by Reed (credited under his birth name, Jerry Hubbard) and Dick Feller. It became Reed's signature song and is on multiple albums, including Country Legends and his live album Jerry Reed "Live!" (Still). In 1991, it was arranged for orchestra by Crafton Beck and recorded by Erich Kunzel and the Cincinnati Pops Orchestra for their album Down on the Farm. Several other groups, such as the U.S. rock band Tonic and U.K.-based country cover band We Be Ploughin' have also covered it. Reed also penned and performed the song for the opening credits, entitled "The Legend", which tells of some of the Bandit's escapades before the events of the film, and the ballad "The Bandit", which is in several versions in the movie and on the soundtrack. Bill Justis is the first name on the credits for the soundtrack, as he composed and arranged original music throughout the film. Musicians such as Beegie Adair and George Tidwell played on the soundtrack. Five-string banjo player Bobby Thompson is prominent toward the end of "East Bound and Down". The soundtrack album was released in 1977 on vinyl, cassette, and 8-track through MCA Records.

Track listing

Reception

Box office
Smokey and the Bandit was a sleeper hit. It premiered at Radio City Music Hall in New York City, where it performed badly. It then opened in just the South of the United States over the Memorial Day weekend and grossed $2,689,851 in 386 theaters. By the end of June, it had played in major Southern markets, including Charlotte, Atlanta, Jacksonville, New Orleans, Memphis, Dallas, and Oklahoma City, grossing $11.9 million. It opened in other Northern states at the end of July. With an original budget of $5.3 million (cut to $4.3 million two days before initial production), the film eventually grossed $126,737,428 in North America, making it the second-highest-grossing movie of 1977 (only Star Wars earned more, with $221.3 million). The worldwide gross is estimated at over $300 million. Reynolds said in 2015 that he most enjoyed this film, and had the most fun making it, of his career.

Critical response
Film critic Leonard Maltin gave the film a good rating (3 stars out of a possible 4) and characterized it as "about as subtle as The Three Stooges, but a classic compared to the sequels and countless rip-offs which followed". In his review in the Chicago Tribune, Gene Siskel gave the film two stars and complained that the film failed to tell the audience when the clock started on the beer run, thus reducing suspense. He claimed that the Bandit is never made aware of Frog's leaving Junior at the altar, which is why the Bandit continually asks why a Texas sheriff is chasing him. However, this is inaccurate; within seconds of Bandit picking her up, Frog tells him "there is a wedding in search of a bride" and goes on to explain her ill-advised romance with Junior, as the Bandit holds up the CB mic for the Snowman to hear. The film's editors, Walter Hannemann and Angelo Ross, were nominated for the Academy Award for Best Film Editing.

On the review aggregation website Rotten Tomatoes, it has a 78% rating based on 32 reviews. The site's consensus states: "Not much in the head but plenty beneath the hood, Smokey and the Bandit is infectious fun with plenty of car wrecks to keep your eyes glued". Alfred Hitchcock claimed that the film was one of his favorites. Upon meeting Reynolds, Billy Bob Thornton told him that the South considers the film to be less cinema and more documentary. Smokey and the Bandit was released in the United Kingdom on August 28 and was a success there, garnering positive reviews.

American Film Institute Lists
AFI's 100 Years...100 Laughs – Nominated
AFI's 100 Years...100 Thrills – Nominated
AFI's 100 Years...100 Heroes and Villains:
Bandit (Bo Darville) – Nominated Hero

Cultural impact

Pontiac Trans Am
After the debut of the film, the Pontiac Trans Am became wildly popular, with sales almost doubling within two years of the film's release. It outsold its Chevrolet Camaro counterpart for the first time. Reynolds was given the 1977 vehicle used during promotion of the film as a gift, though the car itself never actually appeared in the film. Because of the popularity of the film and the sales success of the Trans Am, the president of Pontiac Alex Mair promised to supply Reynolds with a Trans Am each year. Due to his financial difficulties in 2014, Reynolds put his vast collection of artwork and memorabilia up for auction, including the Trans Am. High estimates for the car were up to $80,000, but the actual sale price was $450,000. Also up for auction was a go-kart replica of the car, which sold for nearly $14,000. In 2015 a Florida-based automobile customization company built 77 Trans Ams modeled after the car that Reynolds drove in the film. These new models were built off the same Camaro platform, came with the Pontiac arrowhead, flaming bird, and Bandit logos, and the instrument panels, center consoles, and hood scoops emulating their 1977 counterparts, and were signed by Reynolds. Some differences included the use of a supercharged 454-CID (7.4-liter) Chevrolet-sourced engine that put out 840 HP, and four round headlights, which appeared on the 1967–69 Firebirds/Trans Ams only; the actual 1977–81 models had rectangular headlights.

Diablo sandwich
The "diablo sandwich" ordered by Sheriff Justice in the Arkansas barbecue restaurant scene has entered popular culture as a minor reference to the film. Though no authoritative source identifies the composition of the sandwich, there are several possibilities. A segment of the CMT program Reel Eats used a sloppy joe-style recipe consisting of seasoned ground beef, corn, and sour cream. Another proposal, based more closely on images from the film and the shooting location of the scene (at an Old Hickory House restaurant in Georgia), is pulled pork and hot sauce on a hamburger bun. Other sources in East Texas (from whence Sheriff Justice hails) are familiar with the popular regional delicacy known as the Diablo Sandwich. It consists of any of the various Louisiana-style hot sauces on Texas toast-style bread alongside the fourth most famous product of Pittsburg, Texas (behind Pilgrim's Pride, Cavender's, and Carroll Shelby)Pittsburg Hot Links.

The Bandit Run
The first run in 2007 to celebrate the 30th anniversary of the movie, The Bandit Run was the brainchild of Dave Hall, owner of Restore A Muscle Car. A group of Trans Am owners and fans of the movie take part in an annual road trip from Texarkana to Jonesboro, recreating the route taken by the characters in the film. The Bandit Run quickly became a fixture, celebrating the 40th anniversary of the movie with a special 2017 screening of the film attended by Reynolds and a recreation of the jump undertaken by the Bandit and Frog across a river.

Mobil 1 commercial
In 2014, petroleum company Mobil 1 produced television commercials, featuring then-NASCAR driver Tony Stewart, closely based on the film. Called Smoke is the Bandit and playing on Stewart's nickname, the commercials featured him as the Bandit opposite commentators Darrell Waltrip as the Snowman and Jeff Hammond as Buford T. Justice. The story replaced the Coors beer with Mobil 1 products. The advertisements lampoon the film and feature a Pontiac Trans Am and a cover version of the song East Bound and Down. The commercials were produced after Stewart mentioned that the movie was one of his favorites.

Television censorship and alternative versions

When Smokey and the Bandit first aired on American network television in the early 1980s, censors were faced with the challenge of toning down the raw language of the original film. For this purpose, they overdubbed dialogue deemed offensive, which was common practice. The most noted change made for network broadcast was the replacing of Buford's often-spoken phrase "sumbitch" (a contraction of "son of a bitch"; usually in reference to the Bandit) with the phrase "scum bum". This phrase achieved a level of popularity with children and the 2007 Hot Wheels release of the 1970s Firebird Trans Am has "scum bum" emblazoned on its tail.

Except for Gleason, the original actors mostly redubbed their lines for the television version. Actor Henry Corden, who voiced Fred Flintstone after original performer Alan Reed died the same year the film was released, was used to replace a considerable amount of Sheriff Justice's dialogue. In the U.K., the heavily dubbed version was shown for several years, particularly by the BBC. However, in more recent years, the original version has been shown (on ITV, a commercial channel), usually with the stronger language edited out, often quite awkwardly. The theatrical release has a few lines deleted, including an edit in which Sheriff Justice tells a state trooper to "fuck off" after the sheriff called his vehicle "a piece of crap". His expletive is obscured when a passing big rig sounds its horn. At the time, using "fuck" would immediately require an R rating and this self-censorship allowed the film to avoid this rating and reach a much larger audience. However, the scene and the obscured expletive were played for comedy value and written as such, with the passing truck being the gag of the scene more than a way to avoid the censors.

In 2006, a DVD re-release was issued of Smokey and the Bandit featuring a digitally remastered audio track with 5.1 Dolby-compatible surround sound. Many of the film's original sounds were replaced. For instance, the diesel engine start and run-up sequence in the opening sequence of the film were completely dubbed over with a new sound. A few other examples of sound effect replacement occur when the Bandit takes off after getting the reluctant Cledus involved in the bet, the Bandit comes to a screeching halt on a roadway moments before picking up Carrie, and when Buford's car top comes off. Some of the original sound effects (such as Cledus's dog Fred barking) and music (such as the final chase to the Southern Classic) were removed and not replaced. Earlier DVD releases and the 40th Anniversary Blu-ray of the film have the original soundtrack intact. Major portions of the audio background have been modified with different engine sounds or tire squeals from the original film. The updated version of the film features sound inaccurate for what would be produced by the Trans Am or the numerous other Pontiac vehicles in the film. The original film had correct sounds that were usually recorded live as the action took place.

Sequels
The film was followed by two sequels: Smokey and the Bandit II (1980) and Smokey and the Bandit Part 3 (1983). The second film was a modest box office success, earning $66.1 million against a $17 million budget.

The third film – which had no involvement from either Hal Needham or Sally Field and contained only a short cameo appearance by Burt Reynolds – revolved entirely around Jackie Gleason's character, was panned by critics, and was a box office bomb, earning only $7 million against a $9 million budget.

Television spin-off films

A series of four made-for-TV spin-off films (Bandit Goes Country, Bandit Bandit, Beauty and the Bandit, and Bandit's Silver Angel) were produced in 1994 for Universal Television's Action Pack with actor Brian Bloom playing a younger version of the Bandit. The three original films introduced two generations of the Pontiac Trans Am and the Dodge Stealth in the television movies.

Television series
In October 2020, a Smokey and the Bandit TV series was revealed to be in development, with a pilot written by David Gordon Green and Brian Sides and also executive produced with his Rough House confederates Jody Hill, Danny McBride and Brandon James, as well as Seth MacFarlane and Erica Huggins of Fuzzy Door.

See also
The Cannonball Run
Hooper

References

External links

 
1977 films
1970s action comedy films
1970s comedy road movies
1970s chase films
1977 comedy films
1977 directorial debut films
1970s American films
American action comedy films
American chase films
American comedy road movies
Country music films
1970s English-language films
Fictional duos
Fictional smugglers
Films about automobiles
Films about beer
Films directed by Hal Needham
Films set in Alabama
Films set in Arkansas
Films set in Georgia (U.S. state)
Films set in Mississippi
Films set in Texas
Films shot in Atlanta
Films shot in California
Films shot in Florida
Films shot in Georgia (U.S. state)
Films shot in Los Angeles
Trucker films
Films with screenplays by Charles Shyer
Universal Pictures films
Citizens band radio in popular culture
Pontiac
Films scored by Bill Justis